Daniel "Dani" González Flores (born 18 March 2002) is a Spanish footballer who plays as a forward for Atlético Madrid B, on loan from Albacete Balompié.

Club career
González was born in Albacete, Castilla-La Mancha, and was an Albacete Balompié youth graduate. He made his senior debut with the reserves on 23 January 2021 by starting in a 0–0 Tercera División home draw against Club Atlético Ibañés, and scored his first goal on 21 February, but in a 3–1 away loss against Calvo Sotelo Puertollano CF.

González made his first team debut for Alba on 30 November 2021, coming on as a second-half substitute for Emiliano Gómez and scoring an extra time winner in a 2–1 home success over Racing de Ferrol, for the season's Copa del Rey. On 27 December, he renewed his contract until 2025.

González scored four times during the remainder of the campaign, as his side returned to Segunda División. On 1 September 2022, he was definitely promoted to the first team, being assigned the number 22 jersey.

González made his professional debut on 18 September 2022, replacing Lander Olaetxea late into a 1–0 home loss against SD Ponferradina. On 27 December, after just 21 minutes in five league matches into the season, he was loaned to Atlético Madrid B until June.

References

External links

2002 births
Living people
People from Albacete
Spanish footballers
Footballers from Castilla–La Mancha
Association football forwards
Segunda División players
Primera Federación players
Tercera División players
Tercera Federación players
Atlético Albacete players
Albacete Balompié players
Atlético Madrid B players